Cuprian Macarencu is a Romanian sprint canoer who competed in the 1970s. He won five medals at the ICF Canoe Sprint World Championships with a gold (K-4 10000 m: 1971), a silver (K-4 10000 m: 1975), and three bronzes (K-2 10000 m: 1977, K-4 10000 m: 1973, 1978).

References

Living people
Romanian male canoeists
Year of birth missing (living people)
ICF Canoe Sprint World Championships medalists in kayak